Ezzatabad (also Romanized as ʿEzzatābād; also known as ‘Asgarābād and ‘Askarābād) is a village in Eshkevar-e Sofla Rural District, Rahimabad District, Rudsar County, Gilan Province, Iran. At the 2006 census, its population was 104, in 29 families.

References 

Populated places in Rudsar County